Michel Buskila (born 20 April 1966) is an Israeli politician who served as a member of the Knesset for the New Hope party. He previously served as a deputy mayor of Ashkelon.

Biography 
Buskila was born in Ashkelon to David and Miriam. He worked as a barber, and established several companies responsible for the management of properties, hotels, and commercial activities.

Buskila, the former leader of the Likud in Ashkelon, served as a member of its city council from May 2009, when he replaced resigning member Haim Cohen, and 2022. Buskila also served as a deputy Mayor, and briefly ran for Mayor of Ashkelon in 2018, but withdrew from the race and endorsed incumbent Itamar Shimoni. In 2014, Buskila was elected to the Likud's secretariat.

Ahead of the 2015 legislative election, Buskila ran in Likud primaries for the 22nd spot, reserved for residents of the Negev region, but was defeated by Miki Zohar. Ahead of the 2020 election, Buskila supported Gideon Saar's run for the leadership of the Likud. Sa'ar was defeated by Netanyahu.

In 2021, Buskila joined the newly-formed New Hope party led by Sa'ar, and was placed on the twelfth spot on its list ahead of the 2021 Israeli legislative election. The party won six seats. following the resignation of three of the party's legislators as part of the Norwegian Law, Michal Shir's resignation from the Knesset to join Yesh Atid, and the retirement of two other members of the New Hope list, Buskila became a Member of the Knesset in August 2022. Ahead of the 2022 election, Buskila was placed on the thirteenth spot on the National Unity Party's list.

Personal life 
Buskila is married to Tal and has a daughter called Liam.

References 

Members of the 24th Knesset (2021–2022)
Lists of members of the Knesset